Higashi-Kuyakusho-Mae Station (東区役所前駅) is a Sapporo Municipal Subway in Higashi-ku, Sapporo, Hokkaido, Japan. The station number is H05.

Platforms

Surrounding area
 Sapporo Higashi Ward Office
 Sapporo Garden Park
 Sapporo Beer Museum
 Hokkaido Railway Museum
 Sapporo Higashi Health Center
 Kita-Higashi 12-jo Police Station
 Sapporo Kita-kujo Post Office
 Sapporo Ōtani University
 Sapporo Otani Junior College
 Actors Studio's performing Arts School
 ARIO SAPPORO, shopping mall
 Sapporo Food Center, Kousei branch
 Kousei shopping center
 Homac store, Kousei branch
 GEO store, Kousei branch
 Tsutaya store, Kita 14 Kousei branch
 Hokuriku Bank, Naebo branch
 North Pacific Bank, Kousei branch
 Kousei shinkin Bank, Sapporo branch

External links

 Sapporo Subway Stations

 

 

Railway stations in Japan opened in 1988
Railway stations in Sapporo
Sapporo Municipal Subway
Higashi-ku, Sapporo